Gratsian Botev (12 December 1928 – 16 August 1981) was a Soviet sprint canoeist who competed in the late 1950s. At the 1956 Summer Olympics in Melbourne, he won two medals with a gold in the C-2 10000 m and a silver in the C-2 1000 m events.

References
 

1928 births
1981 deaths
Canoeists at the 1956 Summer Olympics
Soviet male canoeists
Olympic canoeists of the Soviet Union
Olympic gold medalists for the Soviet Union
Olympic silver medalists for the Soviet Union
Olympic medalists in canoeing
Russian male canoeists
Honoured Masters of Sport of the USSR

Medalists at the 1956 Summer Olympics